Igor Alexandrovich Ananskikh (born 6 September 1966) is a Russian politician and Deputy of the State Duma of the Federal Assembly of the Russian Federation. 

Ananskikh was awarded the Medal of the Order "For Merit to the Fatherland" Second Class on 5 April 2017 "for a great contribution to the development of Russian parliamentism and active legislative affairs."

On 24 March 2022, the United States Treasury sanctioned him in response to the 2022 Russian invasion of Ukraine.

References 

1966 births
People from Vladikavkaz
A Just Russia politicians
21st-century Russian politicians
Living people
Recipients of the Medal of the Order "For Merit to the Fatherland" II class
Sixth convocation members of the State Duma (Russian Federation)
Seventh convocation members of the State Duma (Russian Federation)
Eighth convocation members of the State Duma (Russian Federation)
Russian individuals subject to the U.S. Department of the Treasury sanctions